The Sixteenth East Asia Summit was held in Bandar Seri Begawan, Brunei on October 26–27, 2021. The East Asia Summit is an annual meeting of national leaders from the East Asian region and adjoining countries. EAS has evolved as forum for strategic dialogue and cooperation on political, security and economic issues of common regional concern and plays an important role in the regional architecture.

Attending delegations
The heads of state and heads of government of the seventeen countries participated in the summit. The host of the 2021 East Asian Summit is also the Chairperson of ASEAN, the Sultan of Brunei, Hassanal Bolkiah. The summit was held through video conference.

ASEAN downgraded Myanmar's representation and did not allow the Prime Minister of Myanmar, Min Aung Hlaing, to participate in the summit due the 2021 coup d'état. Myanmar did not send any representatives.

Gallery

References

2021 conferences
2021 in international relations
21st-century diplomatic conferences (Asia-Pacific)
ASEAN meetings
2021 in Brunei